, subtitled the popular music, is a tribute album to a Japanese composer Kyōhei Tsutsumi, released in 2007 by Natutawave Records under the distribution of Universal Music Group.

Album information
The album was produced to celebrate the 40th Anniversary of Tsutsumi's professional career as a songwriter. Tadataka Watanabe, his younger brother who has worked as a record executive of Warner Music Japan, was credited as a producer of the whole album.

From among over five-hundreds of his compositions that entered the Japanese chart, following songs were chosen for the album. These original versions were also compiled on CD entitled The Popular Music: Original Compilation, and simultaneously released with tribute album.

About this project, Tsutsumi said as follow: "Songs I wrote 30 or 40 years ago were revisited by younger artists. They have completed 12 tracks for this album, in their own very distinctive and attractive renditions. As a songwriter, I couldn't be happier. I would like to show my greatest gratitude to all the artists and personnel who took part in producing the album."

Track listing
All songs composed by Kyōhei Tsutsumi
"" – 3:04
 Performer – Masayoshi Yamazaki
 Arranger – Takayuki Hattori
"" – 3:30
 Performer – Kou Shibasaki 
 Arranger – Keiji Tanabe (with strings arrangement by Yasuaki Maejima)
"" – 3:59
 Performer – Hideaki Tokunaga
 Arranger – Tokunaga, Masayuki Sakamoto
"Sexual Violet No.1" – 4:44
 Performer – Tsunku
 Arranger – Shunsuke Suzuki
"" – 4:39
 Performer – Bonnie Pink
 Arranger – Shuntaro Kobayashi
"" (renewed lyrics by ET-King) – 2:58
 Performer – ET-King
"" – 5:54
 Performer – Masafumi Akikawa
 Arranger – Takeshi Senoo
"" – 3:49
 Performer – Hitomi Shimatani
 Arranger – Yuta Nakano
"" – 4:12
 Performer – Gospellers
 Arranger – Akira Inoue
"" – 5:09
 Performer – melody.
 Arranger – melody., Yuichi Hamamatsu
"" – 5:06
 Performer – Masamune Kusano (from Spitz)
 Arranger – Shintarō Tokita (from Sukima Switch)
"" – 2:48
 Performer – Crazy Ken Band
 Arranger – Masao Onose, Trio the Dog Horns

Chart positions

References

2007 albums
Tribute albums